Maçka Democracy Park is a recreational area in Istanbul, Turkey, which has paths for jogging, walking and dog walking. It also has children's areas, rest areas and benches and decorative pools.

December 2016 bombing
On 10 December 2016, the park was the site of a suicide bombing, one of two bombings that day for which the Kurdistan Freedom Hawks claimed responsibility. The suicide bombing killed four police officers and one civilian at the park.

References

Parks in Istanbul
Şişli